The River Rib originates near the East Hertfordshire village of Therfield and runs parallel with the A10 through Chipping, Wyddial, Buntingford, Westmill, Braughing, Puckeridge and Standon, before dividing the villages of Thundridge and Wadesmill and continuing until it reaches its confluence with the River Lea near Hertford.

History
The River Rib was used to power an overshot watermill at Ware Park between Hertford and Ware.

The River Rib used to have frequent floods due to heavy rain in the autumn, but this propensity was resolved by dredging and engineering work in the 1970s. 
It was used as the main water supply in Buntingford and the surrounding areas before a pump was installed.

See also
Index: River Lea

References

External links

Rib, River
Rib
1Rib